Brenda María González (born 1995 in Rosario) is an Argentine beauty pageant titleholder who was crowned Miss Argentina 2013 and representen her country at the Miss Universe 2013 pageant.

Miss Argentina 2013
Brenda González was crowned Miss Universe Argentina 2013 at the conclusion of the pageant held on September 14, 2013, as part of the International Tourism Fair in Hall Frers La Rural in Palermo, Buenos Aires. The 20-year-old beauty from Rosario represented Argentina in the Miss Universe 2013 pageant, held on November 9, 2013, in Moscow, Russia but failed to place in the semifinals.

References

External links
Official Miss Universe Argentina website

Living people
Argentine beauty pageant winners
Miss Universe 2013 contestants
People from Rosario, Santa Fe
1993 births